Homer Carroll Jones (born February 18, 1941) is a former American football wide receiver, who played for the National Football League's New York Giants from 1964 to 1969, and for the Cleveland Browns in 1970. During his career, he was known for his considerable size and speed. Fran Tarkenton claimed that he was faster than Dallas Cowboys great Bob Hayes. Jones is credited with inventing the "spike" touchdown celebration.

Early life 

Jones was born on February 18, 1941, in Pittsburg, Texas. His mother was a schoolteacher and his father was a steelworker.

Jones is a cousin of Hall of Fame receiver Charley Taylor of the Washington Redskins and Browns' defensive end Joe Jones.

Jones attended Texas Southern College (now Texas Southern University), a historically black college, and starred in track and field as well as football, running the 100-yard and 220-yard dashes. He was drafted in 1963 by his hometown team, the Houston Oilers of the American Football League, but suffered a knee injury in training camp and was cut.

New York Giants and the "spike"

The New York Giants offered Jones a bus ticket to New York and payment for knee surgery. Known as "Rhino" to his teammates, Jones wore uniform number 45 in New York. Having seen players such as Giants teammate Frank Gifford and Green Bay Packers star Paul Hornung celebrate touchdowns by throwing the ball at opposing fans in the stands, Jones decided to come up with his own, safer post-touchdown maneuver. In a 1965 game, after scoring a touchdown, he threw the football down hard in the end zone. He called the move a "spike". Modern post-touchdown celebrations, including "touchdown dances", are said to have came from Jones' invention. Contributing to his choice of action was a new rule for 1965 which would fine a player $500 if he threw a ball into the stands. Jones said the fine occurred to him, so he decided to throw the ball on the ground instead.

In 1967, Jones had his best season, catching 49 passes for 1,209 yards, an average of 24.7 yards per catch, and 13 touchdowns, leading the NFL in receiving touchdowns. He was second in the league in combined rushing and receiving yards from scrimmage, behind Leroy Kelly of the Browns. He made the NFL's Pro Bowl that season and the next.

Later career and retirement 

In January 1970, Jones was traded to the Browns in exchange for running back Ron Johnson and veteran defensive lineman Jim Kanicki. The Browns were in the market for a new wide receiver after having traded all-pro Paul Warfield to the Miami Dolphins.

In the team's first game of the 1970 NFL season on September 21, 1970, at Cleveland Municipal Stadium, Jones returned the second-half kickoff against the New York Jets for a touchdown, a key play in the Browns' 31-21 win over the Jets in front of 85,703 fans. The crowd, officially the largest crowd in Browns' history, was a part of NFL history that evening in the first game ever played on ABC's Monday Night Football.

However, that touchdown would be the highlight of his one season with the Browns as knee injuries soon caught up with Jones. Soon after being traded to the St. Louis Cardinals in July 1971, he was forced to retire at age 29.

Career statistics 

Jones finished his career with 224 receptions for 4,986 yards, an average of 22.3 yards per reception, and 38 touchdowns (36 receiving, one rushing, one kick return). His yards per reception total ranks #1 in NFL history among players with at least 200 career receptions.

References 

1941 births
Living people
American football wide receivers
Texas Southern Tigers football players
Houston Oilers players
New York Giants players
Cleveland Browns players
Eastern Conference Pro Bowl players
People from Pittsburg, Texas
Players of American football from Texas
American Football League players